The Main Man is an album by drummer Jo Jones recorded in 1976 and released by the Pablo label the following year.

Reception

AllMusic reviewer Scott Yanow stated "65 at the time and still in fine form, drummer Jo Jones had a rare opportunity to lead his own album for Pablo in 1976 ... The music is very much in the Count Basie groove, with purposeful and concise solos, along with some good spots for the leader.".

Track listing
 "Goin' to Chicago Blues" (Count Basie, Jimmy Rushing) – 9:06
 I Want to Be Happy" (Vincent Youmans, Irving Caesar) – 4:48
 "Ad Lib" (Jo Jones) – 8:12
 "Dark Eyes" (Traditional) – 10:20
 "Metrical Portions" (Budd Johnson) – 5:51
 "Ol' Man River" (Jerome Kern, Oscar Hammerstein II) – 4:25

Personnel 
Jo Jones – drums
Harry Edison, Roy Eldridge – trumpet
Vic Dickenson – trombone
Eddie Davis – tenor saxophone
Tommy Flanagan – piano
Freddie Green – guitar
Sam Jones – bass
Buck Clayton – arranger (track 4)

References 

1977 albums
Jo Jones albums
Pablo Records albums
Albums produced by Norman Granz